In Vajrayana Buddhism, the Ādi-Buddha is the "First Buddha" or the "Primordial Buddha". Another common term for this figure is Dharmakāya Buddha.

The term emerges in tantric Buddhist literature, most prominently in the Kalachakra. "Ādi" means "first", such that the Ādibuddha was the first to attain Buddhahood. "Ādi" can also mean "primordial", not referring to a person but to an innate wisdom that is present in all sentient beings.

In Indo-Tibetan Buddhism 
In Indo-Tibetan Buddhism, the term Ādibuddha is often used to describe the Buddha Samantabhadra (in Nyingma), Vajradhara or Kalachakra (in the Sarma schools).

There was also a tradition in India which saw Mañjuśrī as the Ādibuddha, as exemplified by Vilāsavajra's commentary to the Mañjuśrīnāmasamgīti. Vilāsavajra states in his commentary:

The gnosis-being Mañjuśrī is not the bodhisattva who is the master of the ten stages (bhumi). Rather, he is the non-dual gnosis (advayajñāna), the perfection of wisdom (prajñāpāramitā) itself.

According to Anthony Tribe, this tradition may have influenced the Jñānapāda tradition of Guhyasamāja exegesis, which places Mañjuvajra (a tantric form of Mañjuśrī) at the center of the Guhyasamāja mandala.

In the Nyingma (Ancient) School 

In the Nyingma School, the Adi-Buddha is called Samantabhadra (Skt.; Tib. ཀུན་ཏུ་བཟང་པོ་, Kuntu Zangpo; Wyl. kun tu bzang po). Nyingma art often depicts this figure as a naked blue Buddha. According to Dzogchen Ponlop:

The color blue symbolizes the expansive, unchanging quality of space, which is the ground of all arisings, the basis of all appearances, and the source of all phenomena. The absence of robes symbolizes the genuine reality beyond any dualistic, conceptual, or philosophical clothing. That is the dharmakaya buddha: the genuine body of absolute truth.

According to Jim Valby (a translator of the Kunjed Gyalpo Tantra), in the Nyingma school's Dzogchen tradition, Samantabhadra ("All-Good") is not a God but "our timeless Pure Perfect Presence beyond cause and effect." In Nyingma, Samantabhadra is also considered to be the source of all Dzogchen teachings.

The Kunjed Gyalpo Tantra calls Samantabhadra the "All-Creating King" (Tib. Kunjed Gyalpo), because all phenomena are said to be manifestations or displays of Samantabhadra. According to Namkhai Norbu, this does not mean there is some being called Samantabhadra that creates the universe, instead what it refers to is that all things arise from "the state of consciousness Samantabhadra, the state of Dharmakaya." In this sense, Samantabhadra is seen as being a symbolic personification of the ground or basis (ghzi) in Dzogchen thought.

Namkhai Norbu explains that the Dzogchen idea of the Adi-Buddha Samantabhadra "should be mainly understood as a metaphor to enable us to discover our real condition." He further adds that:
If we deem Samantabhadra an individual being, we are far from the true meaning. In reality, he denotes our potentiality that, even though at the present moment we are in samsara, has never been conditioned by dualism. From the beginning, the state of the individual has been pure and always remains pure: this is what Samantabhadra represents. But when we fall into conditioning, it is as if we are no longer Samantabhadra because we are ignorant of our true nature. So what is called the primordial Buddha, or Adibuddha, is only a metaphor for our true condition.

Karl Brunnhölzl states:

Longchenpa's Treasure Trove of Scriptures...explains that Samantabhadra—one of the most common Dzogchen names for the state of original buddhahood—is nothing other than the primordial, innate awareness that is naturally free, even before any notions of "buddhas" or "sentient beings" have emerged.

In Dzogchen thought, there are said to be five aspects of Samantabhadra. Longchenpa explains these as follows:

 Samantabhadra as teacher: "Means that all buddhas while residing in the forms of the sambhogakaya and the dharmakaya in Akaniṣṭha, promote the welfare of all sentient beings through sending forth countless emanations to all the distinct realms of those to be guided."
 Samantabhadra as ground: "Is the dharmata of all phenomena — suchness. This is also called "Samantabhadra as nature".
 Samantabhadra as adornment: "The appearance of all phenomena, which are self-arising as the play of the bearers of the nature of phenomena. This consists of all that is completely pure, in that its nature is illusory."
 Samantabhadra as awareness: "self arising wisdom, the sugata heart," i.e. the Buddha-nature described in the Uttaratantra.
 Samantabhadra as realization: "The fundamental basic nature. Through realizing it well, the eyes of freedom are found. This is also called "Samantabhadra as the path."

In the Sarma (New Translation) Tradition 
Vesna Wallace describes the concept of Ādibuddha in the Kalachakra tradition as follows:

when the Kalacakra tradition speaks of the Ādibuddha in the sense of a beginningless and endless Buddha, it is referring to the innate gnosis that pervades the minds of all sentient beings and stands as the basis of both samsara and nirvana. Whereas, when it speaks of the Ādibuddha as the one who first attained perfect enlightenment by means of imperishable bliss, and when it asserts the necessity of acquiring merit and knowledge in order to attain perfect Buddhahood, it is referring to the actual realization of one's own innate gnosis. Thus, one could say that in the Kalacakra tradition, Ādibuddha refers to the ultimate nature of one's own mind and to the one who has realized the innate nature of one's own mind by means of purificatory practices.

The Guhyasamāja Tantra calls Vajradhāra (the "Vajra holder"),

the Teacher, who is bowed to by all the Buddhas, best of the three vajras, best of the great best, supreme lord of the three vajras.

Alex Wayman notes that the Pradīpoddyotana, a tantric commentary, explains that the "three vajras" are the three mysteries of Body, Speech, and Mind, which are the displays of the Ādibuddha. Wayman further writes:

Tsong-kha-pa's Mchan-'grel explains the "lord of body": displays simultaneously innumerable materializations of body; "lord of speech": teaches the Dharma simultaneously to boundless sentient beings each in his own language; "lord of mind": understands all the knowable which seems impossible.

According to the 14th Dalai Lama, the Ādibuddha is also seen in Mahayana Buddhism as representation of the universe, its laws and its true nature, as a source of enlightenment and karmic manifestations and a representation of the Trikaya.

In East Asian Buddhism 

In Chinese Esoteric Buddhism, and in Japanese Shingon, the Ādibuddha is typically considered to be Mahāvairocana. In Japanese Shingon, the terms Primordial body (honji-shin) and Dharmakaya principle (riho-jin) are used to refer to the Ādibuddha. It is also associated with the letter A, the first letter of the Siddham Alphabet, and is seen as the source of the universe. 

Meanwhile, in the Japanese Amidist or "Pure Land" sects, Amitabha Buddha ("Amida") is seen as being the "Supreme Buddha" or the One Original buddha (ichi-butsu). 

The Lotus Sutra reveals the "Eternal Buddha" in the Essential Teaching (chapters 15-28). The Nikko-lineage, regard Nichiren himself as the Ādibuddha and dispute the contentions of other sects that view him as a mere bodhisattva.

In Vaishnavism 
In the Medieval Orissan School of Vaishnavism, Jagannath was believed to be the first Buddha avatar of Vishnu, or Adi-Buddha; with Gautama Buddha and Chaitanya Mahaprabhu being further incarnations of the Buddha-Jagannath. 

Gurus of Gaudiya Vaishnavaism argue that epithets for the Buddha like Sugata Buddha and Adi Buddha refer to the 9th avatar among the Dashavataras of Vishnu, who was a different person from Gautama Buddha, based on Amarakosha and other Buddhist texts.

See also

 Kulayarāja Tantra
 Divine presence
 Sanghyang Adi Buddha
 Vairocana
 Gautama Buddha in Hinduism

Citations

General and cited references 
 Brunnhölzl, Karl (2018). A Lullaby to Awaken the Heart: The Aspiration Prayer of Samantabhadra and Its Commentaries. Simon and Schuster.
Grönbold, Günter (1995). Weitere Adibuddha-Texte, Wiener Zeitschrift für die Kunde Südasiens / Vienna Journal of South Asian Studies 39, 45-60
Norbu, Namkhai; Clemente, Adriano (1999). The Supreme Source: The Kunjed Gyalpo, the Fundamental Tantra of Dzogchen Semde. Snow Lion Publications.

Buddhas
Dzogchen